Gabriele "Gabi" Roth, (née Lippe, born 8 May 1967) is a retired German hurdler. She represented Germany at the 1992 Olympic Games in Barcelona.

Career
Roth was born Gabrielle Lippe in Lörrach-Brombach, Germany and represented West Germany until 1990. She won a bronze medal in the 60 m hurdles at the 1989 European Indoor Championships in The Hague. At the 1990 European Championships in Split, she won a silver medal in 4x100 m relay, together with Ulrike Sarvari, Andrea Thomas and Silke Knoll. She also reached the 100 m hurdles final, but failed to finish. She represented a united Germany at the 1992 Olympic Games in Barcelona and reached the semi-finals of the 100 m hurdles. A month later at the World Cup in Havana, she won a bronze medal in the 100 m hurdles.

She represented the sports club MTG Mannheim, and won the silver medal at the German championships in 1996. Her personal best time was 12.82 seconds, achieved in August 1990 in Düsseldorf.

International competitions

References

External links

1967 births
Living people
German female hurdlers
Athletes (track and field) at the 1992 Summer Olympics
Olympic athletes of Germany
European Athletics Championships medalists
People from Lörrach
Sportspeople from Freiburg (region)
MTG Mannheim athletes